Alex is a fictional character in Anthony Burgess's novel A Clockwork Orange and Stanley Kubrick's film adaptation of the same name, in which he is played by Malcolm McDowell. In the film, his surname is DeLarge, a reference to Alex calling himself The Large in the novel. In the film, however, two newspaper articles print his name as "Alex Burgess", a reference to Anthony Burgess. In addition to the book and film, Alex was portrayed by Vanessa Claire Smith in the ARK Theatre Company's multimedia adaptation of A Clockwork Orange, directed by Brad Mays.

Character overview
Alex is the narrator in the novel A Clockwork Orange. The character is portrayed as a psychopath who robs, rapes, and assaults innocent people for his own amusement. Intellectually, he knows that such behaviour is morally wrong, saying that "you can't have a society with everybody behaving in my manner of the night". He nevertheless professes to be puzzled by the motivations of those who wish to reform him and others like him, saying that he would never interfere with their desire to be good; he simply "goes to the other shop".

He speaks Nadsat, a teenage slang created by author Anthony Burgess. The language is based on largely English and Russian words, but also borrows from other sources such as Cockney rhyming slang, Romani speech, and schoolboy colloquialisms. His beverage of choice is milk spiked with various drugs, which he and his fellow gang members ("droogs") drink to fortify themselves for "ultraviolence". Alex is very fond of classical music, particularly Ludwig van Beethoven, whom he habitually refers to as "Ludwig Van". While listening to this music, he fantasises about endless rampages of rape, torture and slaughter. Alex's favourite melee weapon is a "cut-throat britva", or straight razor.

Character biography
Alex lives with his parents in a block of flats in a dystopian England in which his brand of "ultraviolence" is common. At the age of 15, he is already a veteran of state reform institutions; in the film, he is somewhat older. He spends his days skipping school and listening to music, and his nights terrorizing the neighborhood with his "droogs" Georgie, Pete, and Dim. While the youngest of his gang, he is the most intelligent, and designates himself as the leader. Georgie resents his high-handedness, and begins plotting against him along with the rest of the gang. One night, the gang breaks into a woman's house, and Alex assaults and kills her by ramming her face with a sculpture of a penis and testicles (in the book it is a bust of Beethoven). As Alex flees from the house after hearing police sirens, Dim hits him with a milk bottle (his chain in the book) and the gang leaves him to be arrested. Alex is found guilty of murder and sentenced to 14 years in prison.

Over the next two years, Alex is a model prisoner, endearing himself to the prison chaplain by studying the Bible. He is especially fond of the passages in the Old Testament portraying torture and murder. Eventually, prison officials recommend him for the Ludovico Technique, an experimental treatment designed to eliminate criminal impulses. During the treatment, prison doctors inject him with nausea-inducing drugs and make him watch films portraying murder, torture and rape. The treatment conditions him to associate violent thoughts and feelings with sickness. Alex is particularly affected by watching footage of Nazi war crimes set to Beethoven's Ninth Symphony, one of his favourite pieces of music; as a result, he can no longer hear it without feeling sick.

His sentence is commuted to time served, and he is released. Once he returns to society, however, he finds that the treatment worked too well: any thought of violence brings him to his knees with pain, and he cannot defend himself. His parents have rented out his room, he is brutalised by his former victims, and beaten by George (Billy Boy in the novel) and Dim, who are now police officers.

He collapses in front of an old house, owned by a writer the government considers "subversive". The writer is one of the gang's victims, but he does not recognise Alex, who had been wearing a mask as he and his friends beat the man and gang-raped his wife, who later died of pneumonia the writer believes was exacerbated by her ordeal. When Alex tells him of his plight, the writer promises to help him. However, the writer realises who Alex is upon hearing him singing "Singin' in the Rain", the very song he had sung while raping his wife (in the book, he recognizes Alex’s voice and speech patterns). He drugs Alex and forces him to listen to the Ninth Symphony, which causes Alex so much pain that he attempts suicide by jumping out of the window.

He survives, but is badly injured, and wakes up in a state hospital. His parents take him back and the government, smarting from the bad publicity, gives him a well-paying job where he can channel his naturally-violent tendencies against the enemies of the state. The effects of the Ludovico Technique have worn off, and Alex is his old, ultraviolent self again: "I was cured, all right".

While the film ends here, the novel features an additional chapter in which Alex, now a few years older, has outgrown his sociopathy. While his new "droogs" commit crime sprees, Alex sits them out as he has lost interest in violence. When he runs into Pete at a coffee shop and learns he got married Alex begins to think about starting a family but is worried his children will inherit his psychopathy.

Reception
The American Film Institute rated Alex the 12th-greatest film villain of all time. Empire magazine selected Alex as the 42nd-greatest movie character of all time, and Wizard magazine rated Alex the 36th-greatest villain of all time. Malcolm McDowell's performance has been widely acclaimed by critics. McDowell was nominated for the Golden Globe Award for Best Actor – Motion Picture Drama, and some consider his failure to receive a Best Actor nomination at the Academy Awards a major snub. In 2008, his performance was ranked #100 on Premier magazine's "100 Greatest Performances of All Time." 

In 2004, Vanessa Claire Smith won LA Weeklys Leading Female Performance award for her gender-bending performance in the stage production of A Clockwork Orange.

References

A Clockwork Orange
Fictional rapists
Fictional torturers
Fictional murderers
Fictional gangsters
Fictional anarchists
Fictional English people
Literary characters introduced in 1962
Characters in British novels of the 20th century
Male characters in literature
Male characters in film
Teenage characters in literature
Teenage characters in film
Characters in written science fiction
Science fiction film characters
Fictional attempted suicides
Male literary villains
Male film villains